Magic Bus is a brand of Stagecoach Group for local bus operations in the United Kingdom, usually operated on routes with strong competition from other operators. The brand is currently used in Manchester and in the past has been used in Glasgow, Newcastle, Liverpool, and Rotherham. A similar brand Magic Mini have also been used in Corby, Ayrshire and the Scottish Highlands.

History

The name was first introduced in Glasgow in 1986, where ex London Transport AEC Routemasters were used on a route to Castlemilk. In 1992 this operation was sold to Kelvin Central Buses.

The brand was used in Newcastle around 1997 when trying to eliminate smaller companies operating in the area. The buses were prone to breaking down due to their age and broken down Magicbuses in Newcastle were common sights.

The Magic Bus brand was reintroduced to Glasgow by Stagecoach West Scotland in 2002. At its peak it was used on three routes; one was withdrawn in 2005, and the remainder in 2006.

It was also used more recently in Liverpool by Stagecoach Merseyside.

The Magic Bus brand was introduced by Stagecoach Manchester to the Wilmslow Road bus corridor where Bullocks Coaches, Finglands Coachways, and UK North competed.

In 2006 the Magic Bus brand was introduced in Manchester on route 192 to counter a bus war started by UK North. Following UK North being delicenced, the Magic Bus ceased operating on route 192 with all services provided by Stagecoach liveried buses.

Buses used in Manchester have been older buses from the Stagecoach Manchester fleet including Leyland Olympians, Volvo B10Ms, Volvo Olympians, Scania N113NRBs as well as some 3-axle Leyland Olympians imported from Stagecoach's Citybus operation in Hong Kong (via a stint with Megabus) and Kenya.

In April 2012, Magic Bus was introduced in Rotherham by Stagecoach Yorkshire on route 22 to compete directly with First South Yorkshire's service of the same route number, albeit a slightly different route terminating at Manvers instead of Barnsley. Dennis Darts were used on this service. This service has since ceased due to low patronage.

In April 2010 Stagecoach Manchester purchased competitor Bullocks Coaches bus operations, but the sale of Finglands Coachways to First Greater Manchester has ensured competition remain on the corridor. In September 2014, route 141 commenced, funded by Manchester Metropolitan University, to serve its Birley Fields accommodation in Hulme. This route was withdrawn in September 2018, after funding from MMU ceased.

In 2018, Stagecoach started operating route 147, from Manchester Piccadilly railway station to West Didsbury, after the expiry of the previous contract with Bullocks Coaches, with the route being extended from its previous terminus at the Manchester Royal Infirmary to West Didsbury, but now omitting the hospital grounds.

Present operations
As of June 2021, the Manchester Magic Bus fleet consisted of 51 2010/2012/2013 built Alexander Dennis Enviro 400 hybrids and one 2008 built Alexander Dennis Enviro 400 transferred from the Stagecoach Manchester fleet, for operation on Wilmslow Road routes 142, 143 & 147. During the COVID-19 pandemic in early 2020, services 143 and 147 were temporarily withdrawn, but were reinstated on 1 June 2020.

Magic Mini
The Magic Mini brand was used in a small number of locations across the UK including Corby and Ayr.

The brand was used in Corby as "Corby's Magic Mini's" operated using Iveco minibuses along lettered routes around the town centre. The service commenced in 1990 under the then-separate United Counties Omnibus Company, with the purpose of revitalising the bus network in the town from the previous downfall of bus travel due to an influx of Hackney carriages. The service was operated by United Counties until the 29 November 1999, when it was incorporated into the Stagecoach group. The livery used on the vehicles was a recoloured version of the Stagecoach "Stripes" paintwork. The main bodywork was black, with the stripes being recoloured to gold. The services ran a 5-6 minute frequency, and were free on Saturdays.

The brand was also used in Ayrshire for a time to compete against Ayrways in Ayr and T&E Docherty in Irvine. The Ayr operation used minibuses and larger single-deck buses branded as Magic Mini, which were introduced in February 2004. The brand has since been dropped in Ayrshire when the competing operators withdrew their services.

The Magic Mini brand was also engaged in a miniature bus war on the Black Isle to Inverness route in the Scottish Highlands with local operator Scotbus, with Stagecoach in Inverness adopting aggressive tactics such as scheduling buses five minutes before the rival operator and undercutting fares. Competition between the two operators was acrimonious, climaxing in an arson attack on Stagecoach's Inverness depot.

References

External links

Bus transport brands
Stagecoach Group bus operators in England
Transport in Glasgow
Bus operators in Greater Manchester
Former bus operators in Scotland